Rebeccah Blum (1967–2020) was an American art historian and curator. Blum was born in Berkeley, California, in 1967 to author Susan Bockius and professor Mark Blum. After studies in art history at American University in Washington, DC, she moved to Germany, where she worked as director at Berlin-based gallery Aurel Scheiblerin and European liaison of David Nolan Gallery in New York.

On July 22, 2020, Rebeccah Blum was killed in Berlin by her former partner, the British photographer Saul Fletcher, who subsequently committed suicide.

References

Sources 
 Artforum Rebeccah Blum, Curator Who Expanded Berlin’s Art Community, Found Dead
 Hyperallergic Reflecting on the Life of Rebeccah Blum, Accomplished Curator, Editor, and Translator
 Monopol Magazine Femizid: Berliner Kunstwelt gedenkt ermordeter Kunsthistorikerin
 Art News 'I Want Her Name to Be Remembered': The Art World Reflects on the Life and Death of Curator Rebeccah Blum
 Art Agenda Remembering Rebeccah Blum – Features – art-agenda.
 Kunstwelt trauert um Rebeccah Blum

1967 births
2020 deaths
American art historians
American curators
American women curators
American women writers
Women art historians
21st-century American women